Shosha may refer to:
Shosha (river) (Russian: Шоша), a river in Tver Oblast and Moscow Oblast in Russia
Shosha (cheese), a kind of Tibetan cheese
Mount Shosha near Himeji, Japan - location of famous Engyō-ji temple
Mount Shosha Ropeway near Himeji, Japan
Shosha (novel), a novel by Isaac Bashevis Singer.